Frank Fontsere (born September 2, 1967) is an American drummer from Marietta, Georgia. He is known mostly for his work in rap metal group Stuck Mojo (1996–2000) and heavy metal group Fozzy (1999–2005, 2009–2022). He has also been a member of Agent Cooper (2004, 2005), The Duke (2005), Soundevice (2006), Love Said No (2007) and Primer 55 (2007). He is famous for using drum triggers on his albums and for every live performance.

Discography 
with Stuck Mojo
Violated EP (European release) (1996)
Pigwalk (1996)
Rising (1998)
HVY1 (1999)
Declaration of a Headhunter (2000)
Violate This (2001)
Here Come The Infidels (2016)
with Fozzy
Fozzy (2000)
Happenstance (2002)
WWE Originals (2004)
All That Remains (2005)
Chasing the Grail (2010)
Sin and Bones (2012)
Do You Wanna Start a War (2014)
Judas (2017)
with Agent Cooper
Beginner's Mind (2004)
with The Duke
The Duke – My Kung-Fu is Good (2005)
with Love Said No
Love Said No EP (2007)

References

External links 
 Official Fozzy website
 Official Walking With Kings website
 
 

Fozzy members
Musicians from Marietta, Georgia
1967 births
Living people
20th-century American drummers
American male drummers